Sheikh Jamal al-Din Hamdan was a Lebanese Druze Sheikh living in the nineteenth century in Mount Lebanon in Bater, Chouf District.

History
Following the Lebanese civil war of 1859-1860, Hamdan was sentenced to death by the Ottoman Turkish authorities alongside ten other Druze sheikhs : Sheikh Sa'id Jumblat, Sheikh Hussein Talhuq, Sheikh As'ad Talhuq, Sheikh Qasim Abu Nakad, Sheikh As'ad 'Imad, Amir Muhammad Qasim Arslan, Sheikh Salim Jumblat, Muhyi al-Din Shibli, 'Ali Sa'id, and Bashir Miri Sa'id.

The Ottoman government's extraordinary envoy to the region, Fuad Pacha, had ordered that these men be executed for their participation in the atrocities of the Lebanese civil war of 1859-1860 against the Maronite Christians.  According to C.H. Churchill's 1862 The Druzes and the Maronites, "none of these sentences have carried into execution, whether of death or of penal imprisonment".

A Part of the Hamdan family had been banished from Mount Lebanon following the battle of Ain Dara in 1711.  This battle was fought against two Druze factions : the Yemeni and the Kaysi. The Kaysi were represented by the Jumblat and Arslan families and the Yemeni by the Hamdan and Al-Atrash families. And the other part stayed in Lebanon, and ruled Al Mnasef region, which contained many villages, and made Deir Koushe as their home village. and then moved to Bater, Chouf District; after Sheikh Bashir Jumblat, their relative, asked them to go and stay there, by an order from Prince Bashir Shehab, because of their daily fights/wars with their neighbors Al Nakad (which they wanted to be the leaders in Mnasef). The Hamdan Family used to be and are still from the wealthiest Druze Sheikhs (Lords) in Lebanon and Al-Sham.

Following their dramatic defeat, the Yemeni faction migrated to Syria in the Jebel-Druze region and its capital, Soueida.

There are presently numerous Hamdan family members, both Druze and Muslims living in Lebanon, but only the Hamdan family in Bater, Chouf District is the descendant of the Royal Hamdanides.

Ottoman period in Lebanon
Year of birth missing
Year of death missing
Druze people from the Ottoman Empire
19th-century people from the Ottoman Empire